Paul Grimley is a Gaelic football manager.

Grimley arrived at Armagh as Paddy O'Rourke's assistant, being in the role for a year before becoming manager. After two years in the role, Grimley resigned as Armagh manager on August 13 2014. 

Grimley publicly apologised in an unprecedented move in 2013, issuing a statement to the fans' forum on the Armagh GAA's official website. The move followed a four-point defeat to Cavan in the Ulster championship.

Grimley was involved in management for 13 years. He had previously served as assistant to Kieran McGeeney after McGeeney was appointed manager of the Kildare county team in 2007.

Grimley hit out at the 'witchhunt' of a GAA player over a gouged-eye in the All-Ireland quarter-final between Armagh and Galway in June 2022.

References

Year of birth missing (living people)
Living people
Gaelic football managers
Kildare county football team